= Yamaha Blaster =

Yamaha Blaster YFS200
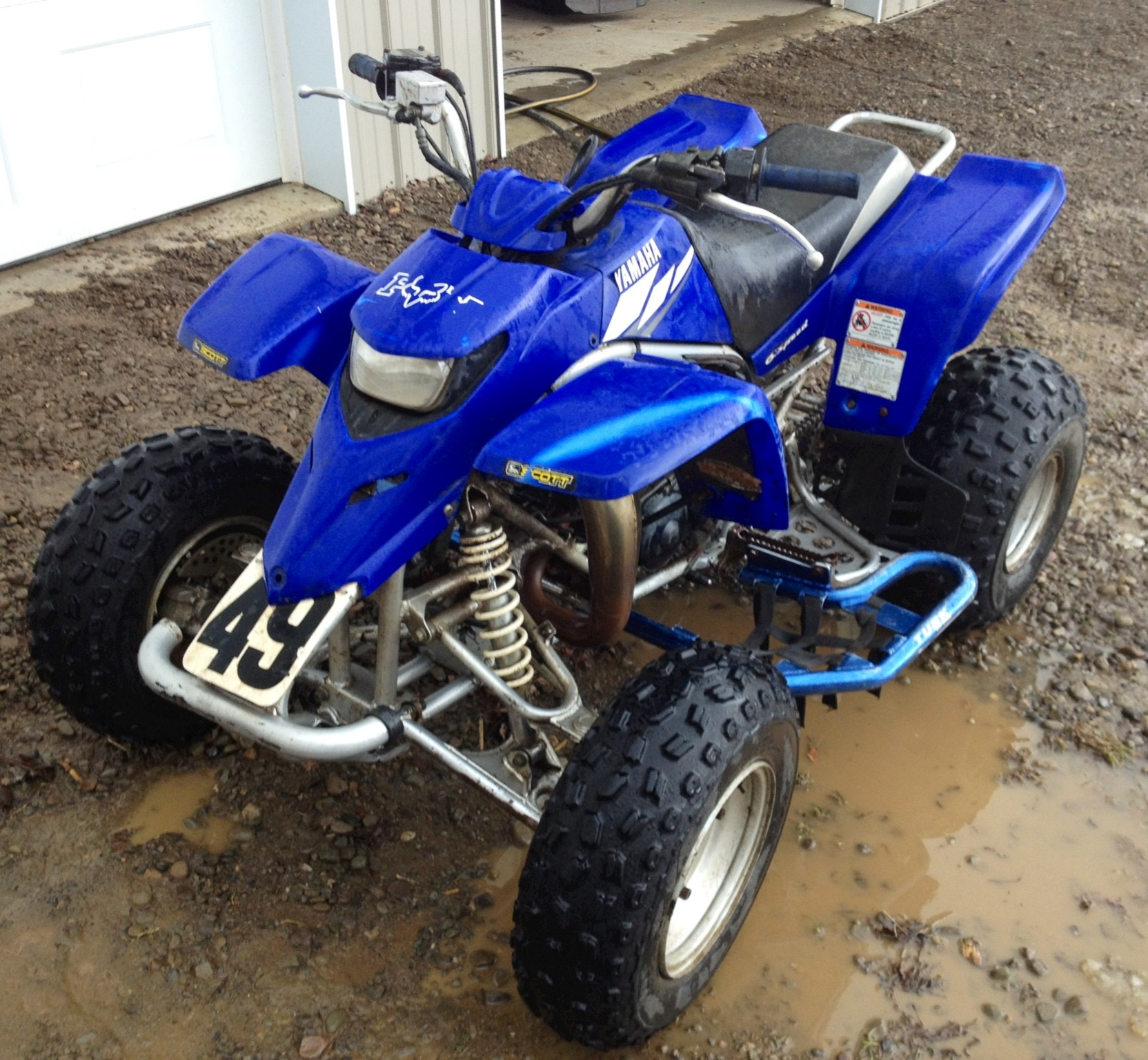
- Manufacturer: Yamaha
- Production: 1988–2006 (2007 or later can be found in some foreign markets)
- Assembly: Japan
- Successor: Yamaha Raptor 250
- Class: Compact ATV
- Engine: 195cc Single-Cylinder Air-Cooled 2-Stroke
- Bore / stroke: 66 mm x 57 mm
- Compression ratio: 6.6:1
- Top speed: 55 mph (89 km/h)
- Power: 17 Horsepower (stock)
- Torque: 8.9 Foot-Pounds
- Ignition type: CDI
- Transmission: 6-speed sequential gearbox with manually-operated wet-plate clutch
- Suspension: Independent Double Wishbone, 7.1" w/ 5-way Preload Adjustment (front); Swingarm, 7.1" and Threaded Preload Adjustment (rear)
- Brakes: 1988-2002 Mechanical Drum, 2003-2006 Dual Hydraulic Disc (front); 1988-2002 mechanical disc, 2003-2006 Hydraulic Disc (rear)
- Tires: AT21 x 7-10 4/156 bolt pattern (front); AT21 x 10-8 4/100 bolt pattern (rear)
- Wheelbase: 43.3" (110 cm)
- Dimensions: L: 68.3" (173.5 cm); W: 40.7" (103.4 cm); H: 40.9" (103.9 cm)
- Seat height: 29.13" (74 cm)
- Weight: 306 lb (139 kg) (dry); 324 lb (147 kg) (wet)
- Fuel capacity: 2.7 US gal (10 L; 2.2 imp gal)
- Oil capacity: 650 ml (0.69 US qt)
- Turning radius: 6'

The Yamaha Blaster is a compact all-terrain vehicle produced as an entry-level machine manufactured in Japan and sold in the United States from 1988 to 2006. Because of the Blaster's initial low price tag, it sold in large numbers for many years from its inception in 1988 all the way to present day. Enthusiasts are still buying and building Blasters that compete with modern day four-strokes. Its two-stroke engine is easily modified and a large aftermarket now exists for the quad. A range of add-ons are readily available from simple bolt on modifications and suspension parts to complete aftermarket frames and big bore kits to give more power to the engine.

The heavily finned, air-cooled Blaster engine has roots from a water-cooled machine (Yamaha DT200), as evidenced by the plugged water pump casting on the right side of the engine. The Yamaha DT200 engine shares the same engine case and side covers. The history of the engine in its water-cooled form can be traced directly back to the DT200 and RD/RZ125LC (shares identical crankcases but uses a different stroke crank) and the Australian market WR200. It is possible to use parts from all of these bikes and build an all-Yamaha water-cooled Blaster engine, or one can simply swap the engines since the engine mounts are nearly identical.

In 2002, Yamaha engineers redesigned the tail light housing into a multi-functional tail light and brake light.

For the 2003 model year, the Blaster was updated with a re-styled nose, the headlight assembly was moved down from the handlebars to the nose, and weight was removed for greater performance. The problematic mechanical front and rear drum brakes were replaced with hydraulic disc brakes to boost stopping power, reduce weight and mechanical complexity, and simplify maintenance.

Because of U.S. government emissions requirements, the Blaster was discontinued for 2007 and was replaced by the entry-level Yamaha Raptor 250cc, which uses a cleaner-burning, less powerful four-stroke engine. The Blaster is closer in performance to the Yamaha Raptor 350cc or the Honda TRX300EX.

== Specification ==
=== Engine ===
- Stock: 195cc, air-cooled, 2 stroke
- Bore x Stroke: 66mm x 57mm
- Carburetor: Mikuni 26mm
- Ignition: CDI
- Starting System: forward kick start
- Drive Train: RWD with sealed o-ring chain
- Transmission: 6-Speed, Manual Clutch

=== Suspension ===
- Front Suspension Type: Independent Double Wishbone (A-arm)
- Front Wheel Travel: 7.1" (18.0 cm)
- Rear Suspension Type: Swing Arm
- Rear Wheel Travel: 7.1" (18.0 cm)

=== Dimensions ===
L x W x H: 68.3" x 40.7" x 40.9" (173.5 cm x 103.4 cm x 103.9 cm)

- Seat Height: 40.9" (74 cm)
- Wheelbase: 43.3" (110 cm)
- Ground Clearance: 4.7" (11.9 cm)

=== Other ===
- Lighting: 35W Halogen Multi-reflector Headlight & 21/5W Brake light
- Top Speed 55 mph stock
